Eugen Ortner (1890-1947) was a German playwright and writer. His works include the 1928 tragedy Meier Helmbrecht and an anti-semitic stage version of Jud Süß, written to ingratiate himself with the new Nazi regime. He later concentrated on writing historical biographies and novels, including of George Frideric Handel in 1942.

References

Bibliography 
 Noack, Frank. Veit Harlan: The Life and Work of a Nazi Filmmaker. University Press of Kentucky, 2016.
 Schmidt, Alexander. Kultur in Nürnberg 1918-1933: die Weimarer Moderne in der Provinz. Sandberg-Verlag, 2005.

1890 births
1947 deaths
Writers from Nuremberg
20th-century German dramatists and playwrights